Nebraska Highway 5 is a highway in southern Nebraska.  It has a southern terminus at an intersection with U.S. Highway 136 in Deshler and a northern terminus at an intersection with Nebraska Highway 4 between Davenport and Carleton.  It is a north–south highway which lies entirely in Thayer County.

Route description
Nebraska Highway 5 begins at an intersection with US 136 in Deshler.  It heads directly to the north from Deshler, having no major intersections with other highways as it passes through farmland.  It terminates at NE 4 east of Davenport.

Major intersections

History
N-5 was originally designated in 1925 from the Kansas state line south of Falls City to the Iowa state line at South Sioux City, replacing Nebraska Highway 10, Nebraska Highway 11, Nebraska Highway 12 and a portion of Nebraska Highway 13. Around 1933 this highway became part of U.S. Route 73, U.S. Route 75, U.S. Route 77 and N-9, and the N-5 designation was transferred to its current route.

References

External links

Nebraska Roads: NE 1-10

005
Transportation in Thayer County, Nebraska